Zaur Khazrailovich Takhushev (Заур Хазраилович Тахушев, born  in Nartkala) is a Russian male weightlifter, competing in the 85 kg category and representing Russia at international competitions. He participated at the 2004 Summer Olympics in the 85 kg event.

Major results
 - 2004 European Championships Light-Heavyweight class (377.5 kg)
 - 2006 European Championships Light-Heavyweight class (370.0 kg)

References

External links
 

1982 births
Living people
Russian male weightlifters
Weightlifters at the 2004 Summer Olympics
Olympic weightlifters of Russia
20th-century Russian people
21st-century Russian people